Mercer Island is a city in King County, Washington, United States, located on an island of the same name in the southern portion of Lake Washington. Mercer Island is in the Seattle metropolitan area, with Seattle to its west and Bellevue to its east.

Mercer Island is connected to the mainland on both sides by bridges carrying Interstate 90, with the city of Seattle to the west and the city of Bellevue to the east. The Lacey V. Murrow Memorial Bridge and the parallel Homer M. Hadley Memorial Bridge are floating bridges that span Lake Washington and carry, respectively, eastbound and westbound lanes of Interstate 90 and connect Mercer Island to the northern portion of Seattle's South End. I-90 traverses the northern portion of Mercer Island and is then carried from the island to Bellevue over the East Channel of Lake Washington by the East Channel Bridge. Mercer Island is located closer to Bellevue than it is to Seattle, and is therefore often considered to be part of King County's Eastside.

The population was 25,748 at the 2020 census.

The ZIP code 98040 is unique to Mercer Island. Mercer Island has the fifth highest per-capita income in the state of Washington and is one of the 100 richest ZIP codes in the USA according to the IRS figures for Adjusted Gross Income.

History

The western side of the island was home to two Snoqualmie villages prior to white settlement in the Puget Sound region. Mercer Island, named for the Mercer family of Seattle, was first settled by non-indigenous people between 1870 and 1880. The Mercer brothers often rowed between the island and Seattle to pick berries, hunt, and fish. Those brothers, Thomas Mercer and Asa Mercer, were members of the Mercer family of Virginia. The first large settlement, East Seattle, was toward the northwest side of the island—near the McGilvara neighborhood. During 1889, a C C Calkins built a large and gilded resort, the Calkins Hotel. The hotel was reached via steamboat between Madison Park, Leschi Park, and the Eastside. Guests included President Benjamin Harrison, of 1901, amongst other well-to-do dignitaries from Seattle to the East Coast of the United States. Burned by a mysterious fire, the hotel was razed during 1908.

The Calkins Landing continued service and presumably aided the establishment of a more permanent population. A denser urban community with business district developed toward the central northern island between the McGilvra neighborhood and Luther Burbank Park. This community now composes the majority of the island's crest through the Middle Island neighborhood.

In 1923, the East Channel Bridge was built to connect the island with Bellevue. In 1930, George W. Lightfoot requested a bridge between Mercer Island and Seattle. The Lacey V. Murrow Memorial Bridge, currently the second longest floating bridge in the world, was built and opened in 1940. In 1989, a second bridge, the Homer M. Hadley Memorial Bridge, was built parallel to the Lacey V. Murrow Memorial Bridge. The East Channel Bridge, Lacey V. Murrow Memorial Bridge, and Homer M. Hadley Memorial Bridge, carry Interstate 90 from Seattle, across Mercer Island, and into Bellevue.

The City of Mercer Island was incorporated from East Seattle on July 5, 1960, and comprised all the island minus the  business district. Just over one month later, August 9, the Town of Mercer Island was incorporated from that business district. The two aforementioned municipalities merged as the City of Mercer Island on May 19, 1970.

Geography

Mercer Island City Hall is located at  (47.5775, -122.212).

Mercer Island is the most populated island in a lake in the US.

Climate
This region experiences warm (but not hot) and dry summers, with no average monthly temperatures above 71.6 °F.  According to the Köppen Climate Classification system, Mercer Island has a warm-summer Mediterranean climate, abbreviated "Csb" on climate maps.

Education
The Mercer Island School District operates seven schools on the island: four primary schools (Lakeridge Elementary, Island Park Elementary, West Mercer Elementary and Northwood Elementary); one middle school (Islander Middle School); one high school (Mercer Island High School); and one alternative secondary school (Crest Learning Center).

Mercer Island is also home to St. Monica School's, the French American School of Puget Sound, and the Northwest Yeshiva High School (9-12).

Demographics

An estimated 25% of city households are Jewish; the island also has two synagogues and a Jewish Community Center.

2020 census
As of the census of 2020, there were 25,748 people and 10,128 households residing in the city.

According to the 2020 United States Census, Mercer Island's racial and ethnic composition is as follows:

 White: 64.6% (Non-Hispanic Whites: 63.6%)
 Asian: 23.0% 
 Black or African American: 1.1%
 Hispanic or Latino (of any race): 4.6% 
 American Indian and Alaska Native: 0.2%
 Native Hawaiian and Other Pacific Islander: 0.1%
 Other race: 1.3%
 Two or more races: 9.6%

There were 10,128 households, of which 62.5% were married couples living together, 5.5% had a female householder with no spouse present, 2.5% had a male householder with no spouse present, and 29.6% were non-families. 34.2% of households had children under the age of 18 living with them. 22.6% of all households were made up of individuals, and 14.8% had someone living alone who was 65 years of age or older. The average household size was 2.54 and the average family size was 3.03.

23.6% of residents were under the age of 18, and 20.6% were over the age of 65. 52.5% of residents were female. The median household income was $150,506.

2010 census
As of the census of 2010, there were 22,699 people, 9,109 households, and 6,532 families residing in the city.

According to the 2010 United States Census, Mercer Island's racial and ethnic composition is as follows:

 White: 77.9% (Non-Hispanic Whites: 75.1%)
 Asian: 15.9% (7.3% Chinese, 2.6% Korean, 2.3% Japanese, 1.7% Indian, 0.5% Filipino, 0.5% Vietnamese, 1.0% Other Asian)
 Black or African American: 1.3%
 Hispanic or Latino (of any race): 2.8% (1.3% Mexican, 0.1% Puerto Rican, 0.1% Cuban, 1.3% Other Hispanic or Latino)
 American Indian and Alaska Native: 0.2%
 Native Hawaiian and Other Pacific Islander: 0.1%
 Other race: 0.7%
 Two or more races: 3.9% (2.4% White and Asian, 0.3% White and African American, 0.3% White and Native American, 0.2% White and Other Race)

There were 9,109 households, of which 33.5% had children under the age of 18 living with them, 62.3% were married couples living together, 6.5% had a female householder with no husband present, 2.9% had a male householder with no wife present, and 28.3% were non-families. 24.1% of all households were made up of individuals, and 11.8% had someone living alone who was 65 years of age or older. The average household size was 2.48 and the average family size was 2.97.

The median age in the city was 46 years. 24.6% of residents were under the age of 18; 4.8% were between the ages of 18 and 24; 19% were from 25 to 44; 32% were from 45 to 64; and 19.5% were 65 years of age or older. The gender makeup of the city was 48.7% male and 51.3% female.

2000 census
As of the census of 2000, there were 22,036 people, 8,437 households, and 6,277 families residing in the city. The population density was 3,452.0 inhabitants per square mile (1,333.6/km2). There were 8,806 housing units at an average density of 1,379.5 per square mile (532.9/km2). The racial makeup of the city was 84.09% White, 1.14% African American, 0.16% Native American, 11.87% Asian, 0.07% Pacific Islander, 0.52% from other races, and 2.16% from two or more races. Hispanic or Latino of any race were 1.86% of the population.

There were 8,437 households, out of which 35.5% had children under the age of 18 living with them, 65.6% were married couples living together, 6.7% had a female householder with no husband present, and 25.6% were non-families. 22.1% of all households were made up of individuals, and 11.2% had someone living alone who was 65 years of age or older. The average household size was 2.58 and the average family size was 3.03.

In the city the population was spread out, with 26.0% under the age of 18, 4.2% from 18 to 24, 21.2% from 25 to 44, 29.9% from 45 to 64, and 18.7% who were 65 years of age or older. The median age was 44 years. For every 100 females, there were 92.7 males. For every 100 females age 18 and over, there were 88.3 males.

The median income for a household in the city was $91,904, and the median income for a family was $110,830. Males had a median income of $82,855 versus $46,734 for females. The per capita income for the city was $53,799. About 1.9% of families and 3.2% of the population were below the poverty line, including 3.4% of those under age 18 and 2.3% of those age 65 or over.

Government

Mercer Island uses a Council–manager government and the city council selects the mayor. The City Hall building in the northeast part of the city hosts offices for the City Manager and most local administrative employees, the municipal court, and the police department.

At the national level, Mercer Island is located in Washington's 9th congressional district, which is currently represented by Democrat Adam Smith.  The City of Mercer Island is part of the 41st Legislative District, served by two State Representatives and one State Senator.

The Mercer Island Fire Department operates out of two facilities, both of which are close to Island Crest Way. The Mercer Island Police Department operates out of one facility, which is adjacent to I-90. The city operates neither a potable water treatment facility nor a wastewater treatment facility, the latter being handled by the King County Wastewater Treatment Division, which owns and operates a collector sewer around the island.  The Public Works Department operates an office facility, street maintenance facility, and city shop from a building south of the City Hall.

In February 2021, a 6–1 majority of the Mercer Island City Council passed an ordinance prohibiting outdoor camping on public property, mainly to restrict homeless and unhoused people from overnight stays. The ordinance was criticized by the American Civil Liberties Union of Washington and other public advocates for the homeless.

Parks
The park has a public boat dock and fishing pier, a swimming beach, an amphitheater, tennis courts, barbecues and picnic facilities, and an off-leash dog area. The city assumed maintenance of the park on January 1, 2003 from King County, which had purchased the park land in 1969.

The Aubrey Davis Park is atop the I-90 tunnel entrances. This park has softball fields, tennis courts, basketball courts, picnic shelters, and the Freeway Sculpture Park. Due to its location atop the I-90 tunnel, the park is also locally referred to as "The Lid."

Deane's Children's Park, also known as "Dragon Park", is a small park with playground equipment including a large concrete dragon structure.

Clarke Beach is located at the south end of Mercer Island and is home to the annual polar bear swim on New Year's Day.

Mercer Island also has many smaller parks maintained by the city, some of which have waterfront access. In 2010, the city built a well in Rotary Park to supply the area with water in the event of a major disaster, specifically an earthquake.

Culture

Sister cities
Mercer Island's sister city, as designated by Sister Cities International, is Thonon-les-Bains, France.

Annual events
 Summer Celebration is a celebration that occurs once a year on the weekend after the 4th of July. It lasted for 30 years before being cancelled in 2019 due to budget cuts. It was revived in 2022.
 The Mercer Island Farmers Market operates most Sundays between June and October. A special version of the market called the Harvest Market occurs on a Sunday in November. There is no farmer's market on the Summer Celebration weekend nor on the Seafair weekend. The market contains local produce including fruit, vegetables and some crafts.

Notable people

 Paul Allen, co-founder of Microsoft
 Matthew Boyd, Professional Baseball Pitcher for the Seattle Mariners
 Ann Dunham, mother of former President Barack Obama
 Aaron Levie, CEO and co-founder of Box, Inc.
 Rashard Lewis, former NBA player
 George Lightfoot, promoter for building the Lacey V. Murrow Memorial Bridge
 Howard Lincoln, former chairman of Nintendo of America, current CEO and chairman of the Seattle Mariners　 
 Joel McHale, comedian
 Michael Medved, radio show host, author, political commentator and film critic 
 Steve Miller of the Steve Miller Band
 Jordan Morris, forward for the Seattle Sounders FC
 Alan Mulally, former CEO of Ford
 Bill Russell, former NBA player and coach, Hall of Famer (died on Mercer Island)
 George Russell (serial killer)
 Frank Shrontz, former CEO and chairman of Boeing
 Quin Snyder, former head coach of the Utah Jazz
 Mary Wayte, two-time Olympic gold medal swimmer

Transportation

Mercer Island is bisected by Interstate 90, which connects the city to Seattle in the west and Bellevue in the east. The freeway travels over the Lacey V. Murrow and Homer M. Hadley floating bridges over Lake Washington to Seattle and the East Channel Bridge towards Bellevue. The bridges also carry the Mountains to Sound Greenway, which includes a multi-purpose pedestrian and bicycle path. A significant section of the freeway is recessed below street level and covered by the Mercer Island Lid, which includes several parks.

The city's public transportation is provided by King County Metro and Sound Transit, mainly consisting of express bus routes to Seattle and the Eastside. Several routes connect to a park and ride on the north side of the island with 447 stalls. It was expanded into a two-story parking garage in 2008. All-day service for most of the island is provided by Metro Route 204, which is supplemented by Route 630 and several school bus routes during peak periods.

In spring 2025, a light rail station at the park and ride facility will be opened by Sound Transit, providing service on the 2 Line to Seattle and the Eastside. The light rail line will replace several express routes on Interstate 90 and Mercer Island will function as a major bus–rail interchange.

See also

References

External links

 Official website
 Mercer Island Reporter, local newspaper

Cities in King County, Washington
Lake islands of Washington (state)
Islands of King County, Washington